Djibo Airport  is an airport serving the village of Djibo in the Soum Province, part of the Sahel Region of Burkina Faso.

See also
List of airports in Burkina Faso

References

External links 
 Airport record for Djibo Airport at Landings.com
 

Airports in Burkina Faso
Soum Province